Johann Wolfgang Franck (17 June 1644 in Unterschwaningen, Mittelfranken – ca. 1710 in London) was a German baroque composer.

Life
He worked from 1673 to 1679 as Kapellmeister in Ansbach and then lived from 1679 to 1690 in Hamburg. Here he initially composed several geistliche Sing-Spiele for the Oper am Gänsemarkt. From 1682 to 1685 he held the position of cantor in St. Mary's Cathedral. From 1690 he lived in London. Together with Robert King, he went there first as a concert promoter (1690 to 1693) and was thereafter only active as composer. Besides operas, he produced some songs (especially for the Concerts in London), cantatas and numerous hymn tunes.

Works

Operas
Die errettete Unschuld, oder Andromeda und Perseus, Ansbach, 1675
Der verliebte Föbus, Ansbach, 1678
Die drey Töchter (des) Cecrops, Ansbach, 1679
Don Pedro, oder Die abgestraffte Eyffersucht, Hamburg, 1679
Die macchabaeische Mutter mit ihren sieben Söhnen, Hamburg, 1679
Pastorelle, Lustschloss, Triesdorff, Ansbach, 1679
Die wohl- und beständig-liebende Michal, oder Der siegende und fliehende David, Hamburg, 1679
Aeneae, des trojanischen Fürsten Ankunft in Italien, Hamburg, 1680
Alceste, Hamburg, 1680
Sein selbst Gefangener, Hamburg, 1680
Charitine, oder Göttlich-Geliebte, Hamburg, 1681
Hannibal, Hamburg, 1681
Semele, Hamburg, 1681
Vespasian, Hamburg, 1681
Attila, Hamburg, 1682
Diocletianus, Hamburg, 1682
Der glückliche Gross-Vezier Cara Mustaphaen, Hamburg, 1686

Incidental music
Love’s Last Shift, London, 1696
The Judgment of Paris,  London, 1702
3 lost dramatic works

Cantatas
11 Cantatas
61 lost cants.
12 lost Tafelstücke

Sacred and secular songs
Passionsgedanken (lost)
Geistliche Lieder, 2vv, opt. bc Hamburg, 1681, repr. in Geistliches Gesangbuch
M. Heinrich Elmenhorsts besungene Vorfallungen, 1v, bc Hamburg, 1682, repr. in Geistliches Gesangbuch
Geistliches Gesangbuch, 1v, bc Hamburg, 1685, repr. with works by G. Böhm and P.L. Wockenfuss in M. Heinrich Elmenhorsts … geistreiche Lieder
Erster Theil musicalischer Andachten, 1v, bc Hamburg, 1687
Remedium melancholiae, or The Remedy of Melancholy, 1v, bc, 1690
A New Song on King William (London, c1690)
15 Songs in the Gentleman’s Journal (1692–4)
O Jesus, Grant Me Hope and Comfort

Instrumental
6 2vl sonatas, lost

Sources
George J. Buelow's article in New Grove Dictionary of Music
W. Braun: Johann Wolfgang Franck: Hamburger Opernarien in szenischen Kontext (1988)

References

External links
 

German Baroque composers
1644 births
1710s deaths
18th-century classical composers
German classical composers
German male classical composers
People from Ansbach (district)
18th-century German composers
18th-century German male musicians